The highest-selling albums and EPs in the United States are ranked in the Billboard 200, which is published by Billboard magazine. The data are compiled by Nielsen Soundscan based on each album's weekly physical and digital sales. In 1990, 8 albums occupied the peak position on the chart.

Please Hammer, Don't Hurt 'Em, the third and most popular album (and second major-label release) by MC Hammer, had the longest run among the releases that reached peak position in 1990, spending 21 non-consecutive weeks in the top position (18 of these weeks were consecutive).  Its popularity was due primarily to the runaway single, "U Can't Touch This".
However, it was criticized for its sampling of other artists' songs. "U Can't Touch This" sampled "Super Freak" by Rick James; "Dancin' Machine" sampled the Jackson 5; "Have You Seen Her" is a semi-cover of The Chi-Lites song; "Help the Children" interpolates Marvin Gaye's "Mercy Mercy Me (The Ecology)"; "Pray" and "She's Soft and Wet" sample the Prince hits "When Doves Cry" and "Soft and Wet" respectively.

The album raised rap music to a new level of popularity. It was the first hip-hop album certified diamond by the RIAA for sales of over ten million. It remains one of the genre's all-time best-selling albums. To date, the album has sold over  18 million copies worldwide.

According to Guinness World Records, the album cost just $10,000 to produce.

Janet Jackson's Rhythm Nation 1814 was the best performing and best-selling album of 1990 despite not reaching number-one at any point during the year. The album achieved 4 weeks atop the chart during 1989.

Chart history

See also
 1990 in music

References

1990
United States Albums